Jantroon Dhar or Jantroon Top is a location in the Doda district, in Jammu and Kashmir, India. It is a local hill station and a meadow in the Forest Block area, 15 kilometers away from Thathri. The place is surrounded by lush green meadows, snow in winters and covered with dense vegetation. Thousands of local tourists visit every year for spectating three days dangal-cum-wrestling match.

Etymology
The word Jantroon is derived from Gojri phrase "Jannat Ma Roon" (trans: Living in Paradise) which later emerged as Jantroon.

About and demographics
The hill station lies in the tehsil Chiralla and Kahara, earlier in Thathri tehsil of Jammu and Kashmir and does not inhabit (Un-inhabited) any population or households near it.
 Local tourists visit annually in Summer to explore the place.

Development
 Jantroon Dhar is 5 km away from the nearest road. Plans have been discussed by the district development commissioner to connect it to the road network.

References

Hills of Jammu and Kashmir
Tourist attractions in Doda district